MailBlocks is an e-mail hosting service company based in the United States, originally established by Phil Goldman in 2002. It was acquired by AOL on August 3, 2004.

Service
Mailblocks offered free challenge-response spam filtering web email service and an IMAP interface as a revenue service.

Patent Troll Controversy
Mailblocks did not invent challenge response to block spam.  Instead, they purchased the rights to two patents related to challenge response: patents US6199102 and US6112227.  Mailblocks then proceeded to patent troll several other companies before releasing any product of their own.  Companies sued included Spam Arrest, DigiPortal, MailFrontier, and Earthlink.  It is worth noting that challenge response was a well known technique for fighting personal spam and mailing list spam for years before the two patents were applied for.  For example, David Skoll described it in detail in a post to a public forum on November 15, 1996.

References

AOL